KAKM, virtual channel 7 (VHF digital channel 8), is a Public Broadcasting Service (PBS) member television station licensed to Anchorage, Alaska, United States. Owned by Alaska Public Media, it is sister to National Public Radio (NPR) member station KSKA (91.1 FM). The two outlets share studios at the Elmo Sackett Broadcast Center on the campus of Alaska Pacific University; KAKM's transmitter is located near Knik, Alaska.

KAKM was the only PBS station in Alaska that was not part of AlaskaOne during its existence. The call letters were chosen to represent the three major geographic areas served by the station: Anchorage, Kenai, and Matanuska.

KAKM operates a full-time satellite station, KTOO-TV (virtual channel 3, VHF digital channel 10), licensed to the capital city of Juneau. This station is owned by Capital Community Broadcasting as a sister to non-commercial FM radio stations KTOO (FM), KNLL, and KRNN, but is operated by Alaska Public Media. KTOO's transmitter is located in downtown Juneau. KTOO was formerly part of AlaskaOne, until its dissolution in 2012.

KAKM is also relayed on low-power station KYUK-LD (virtual and UHF digital channel 15) in Bethel, owned by Bethel Broadcasting, Incorporated as sister to radio stations KYUK (AM) and KYUK-FM.

History
KAKM first started regular transmissions on May 7, 1975 at 7:07 p.m. Previously, PBS programming had been offered to Anchorage stations on per-program basis. (For example, Sesame Street was carried on KTVA [channel 11], Mister Rogers' Neighborhood on KIMO [channel 13, now KYUR], and The Electric Company on KENI-TV [channel 2, now KTUU-TV]).

KAKM became the flagship station of Alaska Public Television, the successor to AlaskaOne, replacing KUAC-TV in Fairbanks, on July 1, 2012 (which became a standalone station again). As a result, KTOO-TV became a full-time satellite of KAKM. KYUK-LD also rebroadcasts KAKM, but it carries the Alaska Rural Communications Service on its second digital subchannel in place of Create.

Station presentation

Technical information
The stations' digital signals are multiplexed:

360 North provides statewide coverage of Alaska public affairs, documentaries, historical programs, and Native topics. Originating at KTOO-TV, 360 North replaced Gavel to Gavel Alaska, which televised the Alaska Legislature.

Analog-to-digital conversion
KAKM and KTOO shut down their analog signals on June 12, 2009, the official date on which full-power television stations in the United States transitioned from analog to digital broadcasts under federal mandate:
 KAKM shut down its analog signal, over VHF channel 7; the station's digital signal remained on its pre-transition VHF channel 8. Through the use of PSIP, digital television receivers display the station's virtual channel as its former VHF analog channel 7.
 KTOO shut down its analog signal, over VHF channel 3; the station's digital signal remained on its pre-transition VHF channel 10. Through the use of PSIP, digital television receivers display the station's virtual channel as its former VHF analog channel 3.

Translators
KAKM and KTOO extend their over-the-air coverage through a network of translator stations.

KAKM translators
Girdwood: 
Homer: 
Kasilof: 
Kenai: 
Ninilchik: 
Sitka:

References

External links
 

1975 establishments in Alaska
PBS member stations
Television channels and stations established in 1975
AKM